Semponarkoil Swarnapureeswarar Temple(செம்பொனார்கோவில் சுவர்ணபுரீசுவரர் கோயில்)is a Hindu temple located at Semponnarkoil in Mayiladuthurai district of Tamil Nadu, India.  This place is also called as Tiruchemponpalli.  The historical name of the place is Lakshmipuri and Indirapuri.The presiding deity is Shiva. He is called as Swarnapureeswarar. His consort is known as Suguntha Kundalambikai.

Significance 
It is one of the shrines of the 275 Paadal Petra Sthalams - Shiva Sthalams glorified in the early medieval Tevaram poems by Tamil Saivite Nayanars Tirugnanasambandar and Tirunavukkarasar.

Literary mention 
Tirugnanasambandar describes the feature of the deity as:

Gallery

References

External links 
 
 

Shiva temples in Mayiladuthurai district
Padal Petra Stalam